, or simply , is located in the heart of Kobe, Japan. This station is the main railway terminal of Kobe.

Lines 
Sannomiya is served by the following railway lines and stations:
Hanshin Electric Railway (Main Line) - Kobe-Sannomiya Station (Hanshin) 
Hankyu Railway (Kobe Line, Kobe Kosoku Line) - Kobe-Sannomiya Station (Hankyu) 
Kobe New Transit (Port Island Line, K01) - Sannomiya Station
Kobe Municipal Subway (Seishin-Yamate Line, S03) - Sannomiya Station
Kobe Municipal Subway (Kaigan Line, S03) - Sannomiya-Hanadokeimae Station (see separate article)
JR West - Sannomiya Station (see separate article)

Hanshin Railway Main Line

Overview 
The current station opened as Kobe Station on 12 April 1905. The station would undergo several name changes until the current name was introduced in 2013 along with the station number (HS 32).

In 1987, platform 3 was extended and a new ticket gate was opened on the north side.

The station was damaged by the Great Hanshin earthquake on 17 January 1995 and all services were suspended. Service was temporarily restored between this station and Kōsoku Kōbe on 1 February 1995, and full restoration of Hanshin Line services would be achieved on 26 June 1995.

Layout
This station has a combination bay/island platform serving three tracks below ground level. Tracks 1 and 3 are for through-trains running between Umeda and Sanyo Himeji, while track 2 is for trains headed to Ōsaka Namba and Kintetsu Nara.

Gallery

Hankyu Railway Kobe Line, Kobe Kosoku Line

Overview 
Hankyu Railway’s station was established in 1936, and as its terminal within the city, was initially referred to as “Kobe”. 

The original station building was noted for its Art Deco architecture and a grand arch through which trains passed on their approach to the station; this was damaged beyond repair in the 1995 Hanshin-Awaji Earthquake and was replaced by a temporary structure, which remained in use until 2020. A new high-rise building is now under construction, mimicking the design of the original station building, but lacking the arch over the tracks.

Layout
This station has two island platforms with three tracks elevated close to JR Sannomiya Station.

Kobe Municipal Subway Seishin-Yamate Line

Layout
This station has a side platform serving a track on the second basement and the third basement.

Gallery

Port Liner

Overview 
The platforms for the Port Island Line opened on 5 February 1981. Platform screen doors have been installed since opening day.

In an announcement in 2018, a proposal was made to extend the Port Island Line to 8-car operation following an increase in ridership.

Layout
This station has an island platform serving two elevated tracks.

Surroundings
East side (East entrance of Kobe New Transit and JR West)
Kobe Shimbun Kaikan (M-INT Kobe)
Sannomiya Bus Terminal (M1 - M11)
Daiei
Chuo Ward Office, Kobe
Shinki Bus Sannomiya Bus Terminal (M15)
South side (East of Flower Road, Center entrance of Hanshin Railway, Kobe New Transit and JR West)
The Chuo Mitsui Trust and Banking Company, Limited Kobe Branch
Hanshin Bus expressway bus (Kobe Sannomiya), Transit buses (Sannomiya-ekimae) (Y1, Y2)
Kobe Sanyo Bus expressway bus (Kobe Sannomiya), Transit buses (Sannomiya-ekimae) (M12 - M14)
Sannomiya OPA
Sogo Kobe
Shinki Bus expressway bus (Kobe Sannomiya), Transit buses (Sannomiya-ekimae) (Y3 - Y5)
Kobe Loft
Transit buses (Hanshin-mae) (Y6, Y7)
Kobe International House
Joshin
South side (West of Flower Road, Entrances of Hankyu Railway, West entrance of Hanshin Railway and JR West)
Kobe Kotsu Center Building
Airport limousine for Osaka International Airport and Kansai International Airport (S1)
Sannomiyacho Itchome (Kobe City Bus) (S2)
Kobe Marui
Transit buses (Hanshin-mae) (S3, S4)
Sannomiya Center-gai
Transit buses (Hanshin-mae) (S5, S6)
Sumitomo Mitsui Banking Corporation Sannomiya Branch
Kobe City Hall
North side (East of Flower Road, East entrance of JR West and Kobe Subway)
Sundai
Transit buses (Subway Sannomiya) (N4 - N8)
North side (West of Flower Road, East entrance of Hankyu Railway and Kobe Subway)
Yoyogi Seminar
Transit buses (Subway Sannomiya) (N1 - N3)
West side (West entrance of Hankyu Railway and Kobe Subway)
Tokyu Hands Sannomiya - connected with the west entrance of Kobe Subway
Ikuta Shrine
Ikuta Police Station (Hyogo Prefecture)
Kobe Mosque a Kobe Islamic Community Center
Kobe Tax Office
NHK Kobe Broadcansting Station

References

See also
 List of railway stations in Japan

External links  

Port Liner Sannomiya Station (P01) (Japanese)
Hanshin Sannomiya Station (Japanese)
Hankyu Sannomiya Station (Japanese)

Railway stations in Kobe
Hankyū Kōbe Main Line
Hanshin Main Line
Stations of Kobe Municipal Subway
Railway stations in Japan opened in 1905